C21 Malhar Mall is a shopping mall in the city of Indore in India. The name represents the twin malls Malhar Mall & C21 Mall located adjacent to each other in Vijay Nagar, Indore. Both the malls are connected via walkways at two junctions in air as well as the ground.

C21 Mall

Stores
 Forever 21 opened its 21st store in the mall in December 2017.

Multiplex
 The mall features an INOX multiplex. INOX developed the multiplex with 9 screens and 1486 seats, including INSIGNIA, MX4D and Club with a focus on upgrading the technology as well as experience.

Malhar Mall

Multiplex
 The mall features a Carnival Cinemas multiplex.

See also
 Treasure Island Next Mall
 Phoenix Citadel Mall, Indore

References

Shopping malls in Madhya Pradesh
Year of establishment missing